Richard Green is an American business executive.

Green was born in Brooklyn, New York. He holds Bachelors and master's degrees with a specialization in Geographic Information Systems (GIS) and spatial analytics.

He joined Sun Microsystems in 1989 serving as Executive Vice President of Software and as VP/GM of Solaris and Java. He left Sun in 2004. 

Green served as CTO of Nokia Corporation and as Executive Vice President of the Mobile and Enterprise business unit at Nuance Communications. Green , green was  the EVP/Chief Product Officer and CTO for SugarCRM.

References

External links
 "Enlighted News - Rich Green Joins Enlighted, Inc. to Lead Technology and Product Development" 1 Nov 2012
 "Computer weekly - Nokia hire Green" 11 May 2010.
 "Internet news - Green heads back to SUN" 2 May 2006.
 "Richard Green, Forbes profile"

American chief technology officers
Businesspeople in software
American computer businesspeople
University at Albany, SUNY alumni
Sun Microsystems people
Nokia people
Living people
Year of birth missing (living people)